The 1998 Super 12 season was the third season of the Super 12, contested by teams from Australia, New Zealand and South Africa. The season ran from February to May 1998, with each team playing all the others once. At the end of the regular season, the top four teams entered the playoff semi finals, with the first placed team playing the fourth and the second placed team playing the third. The winner of each semi final qualified for the final, which was contested by the Auckland Blues and the Canterbury Crusaders at Eden Park, Auckland. The Canterbury Crusaders won 20 – 13 to win their first Super 12 title.

Teams
The 1998 Super 12 competition consisted of 12 teams, they were:
The Blues (New Zealand)
The Brumbies (Australia)
The Bulls (South Africa)
The Cats (South Africa)
The Chiefs (New Zealand)
The Crusaders (New Zealand)
The Highlanders (New Zealand)
The Hurricanes (New Zealand)
The Reds (Australia)
The Sharks (South Africa)
The Stormers (South Africa)
The Waratahs (Australia)

Table

Results

Round 1

Round 2

Round 3

Round 4

Round 5

Round 6

Round 7

Round 8

Round 9

Round 10

Round 11

Round 12

Finals

Semi finals

Grand final

Leading try-scorers

Leading point-scorers

Notes and references

McIlraith, M. (2005).Ten Years of Super 12, Auckland: Hodder Moa. 

 
1998
 
 
 
1998 rugby union tournaments for clubs